Michal Šeda (born October 15, 1982) is a Czech former professional ice hockey defenceman. He played in the Czech Extraliga for HC Pardubice, the Slovak Extraliga for HC Košice and the Ligue Magnus for Scorpions de Mulhouse.

External links

1982 births
Living people
Sportspeople from Pardubice
Czech ice hockey defencemen
HC Dynamo Pardubice players
HC Košice players
Hokej Šumperk 2003 players
LHK Jestřábi Prostějov players
Scorpions de Mulhouse players
Stadion Hradec Králové players
Czech expatriate ice hockey players in Slovakia
Czech expatriate sportspeople in France
Expatriate ice hockey players in France